Jules Michel (born 10 April 1931) is a French artist.

As a child of eight, while exploring the family attic, Jules Michel discovered an old oil-paint box. With it, he quickly improvised his first paintings.

He was an audacious and reckless youth, filled with enthusiasm and a healthy team spirit. He became the top champion speed roller skater in Paris at the age of fourteen. But he was also greatly impressed by the delicacy and extraordinarily precise work of his uncle, engraver Raymond Courcaut. As a result, Michel became a student of advertising, while starting to compete in cycling races and continuing to paint in secret. He received guidance from Georges Rouault and Pablo Picasso but developed his own unique style.

It was just after World War II, during the Saint-Germain-des-Prés period, that Michel met thinkers as Jean-Paul Sartre, Simone de Beauvoir and Boris Vian against a backdrop of music by the still unknown Juliette Gréco, and Sidney Bechet and Claude Luter on their way to fame as jazzmen.

Embracing a career in advertising, Michel moved up the agency ladder quickly and steadily, but never forgot his first love. In 1945 he learnt photogravure, lithography, silkscreen printing and engraving

Michel continued painting and sculpting but was too individualistic and too full of energy to follow a long academic course. Instead, he roamed the Louvre, learned from his artist friends and periodically attended a variety of art schools including, from 1948 to 1951, Ecole des Arts Appliqués et des Arts Décoratifs, Les Beaux Arts and La Grande Chaumière, where he was temporarily interested in Cubism. In 1951 he performed his military service.

In 1973 he established his first studio in Paris. Between 1974 and 1980 he lived in Australia, then moved to Montreal, Quebec, Canada.

Collections

Art collectors who have works by Jules Michel include 
Queen Elizabeth II of the United Kingdom
Mercedes Benz, Sydney
Banque Nationale de Paris, Sydney, Australia
Art Museum, Adelaide, Australia
Musée Laurier, Victoriaville, Canada
Government of Taiwan, Taipei, Taiwan
Robert L. Grant, Sydney, Australia

Exhibitions and awards
First One Man Show, Galerie Raymond Duncan, Paris 1952–1971
Group Exhibition, Salon des Artistes Indépendants and Salon d'Automne, Paris 1956
Winner of the Advertising Trophy for the campaign of the year for "Woolmark" 1968
Retrospective exhibition, Paris 1971
Some 30 one man shows across Australia 1979
Exhibition at Galerie Michele Boussard, Paris 1980
"Hommage to Jacques Brel", Galerie Le Méridien, Montreal 1981
Jubilee and Retrospective, Liebert Art Gallery, Sydney 1982
"Paix Madame", Galerie Hélène Boullé, Montreal 1984
"Forum", Galerie de L'Isle, Montreal 1986
Salon International des Arts, Montreal 1987
"Retrospective exhibition" Musée Laurier, Arthabaska, Canada 1987
 Exhibition at Patricia Judith Art Gallery, Boca Raton, Florida, United States 1988
Salon d'Automne, Montreal 1989
Exhibition at Patricia Judith Art Gallery, Boca Raton, Florida 1990
"Hommage to Van Gogh", Galerie Sherbrooke, Montreal 1991
Tokyo International Art Salon (TIAS), Japan 1992
Consortium des Arts, Hôtel Byblos, Saint-Tropez, France 1992
 Wentworth Art Gallery, Miami, Florida 1993
 Wentworth Art Gallery, Boca Raton, and Palm Beach, Florida 1994
Musée du Mas Carbasse, Saint-Estève, Pyrénées Orientales, France 1996
Château Valmy, Argelès-sur-Mer, Pyrénées Orientales 1997
Salon des Arts, Sofitel, La Défense, Paris 1998
 L'Olivier, Saint-Estève, Pyrénées Orientales
Galerie Maurice-Gabriel François, Levallois-Perret, Groupe CIC, Levallois-Perret, France 1999
Ariotel, Perpignan, Pyrénées Orientales 1998–2000
Le Voilier des Saveurs, Perpignan, Pyrénées Orientales 1998–2000
 Research and preparation for the exhibition "Mille ans d'en France" 206 art pieces 2000
"Mille ans d'en France" Saint-Mamet, Saint-Estève, Pyrénées Orientales
Congress of Mayors of Pyrénées Orientales, Prades, Pyrénées Orientales
Congress of Mayors of France, Paris 2002
Galerie Castelginest, Aude, France 2003
Académie Artistique du Pays Catalan, Baixas, Pyrénées Orientales 2003
Tribute to Charlie Chaplin's, "The Kid", in the presence of Michael Chaplin, Palais des Congrès, Perpignan, Pyrénées Orientales 2003
Galerie Martin Vivès, Chateau Les Pins, Baixas, Pyrénées Orientales 2005
CCAS, Narbonne, Aude 2005
Galerie Phare Sud, Gruissan, Aude 2005
Espace Gibert, Lézignan-Corbières, Aude 2005
Société Générale, Palais de la Scala, Monte Carlo, Monaco 2006
Une promenade en Espagne, Centro Español Perpignan 2006
Centro Español, Perpignan 2007
Galerie Eric Chesnais, Alençon, France 2007
Phare Sud, Gruissan 2007

Notes

20th-century French painters
20th-century French male artists
French male painters
21st-century French painters
21st-century French male artists
Living people
1931 births